Triplane is a Japanese rock band who has released multiple singles and albums, as well as performed songs for the soundtracks of anime, dramas, and other Japanese programming.  off of their most recent album and single has been used as the ending theme for Tomica Hero: Rescue Force. Previously, their single "Dear Friends" was used as the ending theme for One Piece episodes 246 through 255.

Members
 — Vocals & guitar (2002-)
 — Bass (2002-)
 — Drums (2002-)

Former members
 — Guitar (2004-2019)

Discography

Albums
Home - October 18, 2006
ライナーノート
陽だまりのように
スピードスター
Dear Friends
あの雲を探して
Days
夏の夢
Raspberry
Reset
いつものように
僕らの街
 - February 6, 2008
モノローグ
愛の唄
I Am
扉を開くよ
メトロ
Jump ー線の向こうへー
僕に出来る事
Yesterday
エアポケット
ココロハコブ
明日晴れたら

 - February 4, 2009

Always

Around My Life

Singles
 - October 13, 2004
スピードスター
風
セーター
 - May 26, 2005
あの雲を探して
パラダイス
"Reset/ゲンジボタル" - August 3, 2005
Reset
ゲンジボタル
"Dear Friends" - January 11, 2006
Dear Friends　
You
Dear Friends (TVエンディング用70秒バージョン)［初回限定盤のみ］
 - May 17, 2006
いつものように
monopoly
 - August 1, 2007
エナジー
 - November 7, 2007
Disc 1
モノローグ
エナジー
Dear Friends～アコースティックver.～
Disc 2
モノローグ
Singleメドレー
Dear Friends～アコースティックver.～
 - July 16, 2008
夏が終われば
ココロハコブ～TV Ver.～
モノローグ～アコーステックver.～
 - December 3, 2008
CD only
白い花
addiction
白い花～オーケストラVer.～
CD & DVD
白い花
白い花～オーケストラVer.～
夏が終われば～アコースティックLive Ver.～
モノローグ～アコースティックLive Ver.～
Dear Friends～アコースティックLive Ver.～
僕らの街～アコースティックLive Ver.～
ココロハコブ～アコースティックLive Ver.～

References

External links
 

Avex Group artists
Japanese rock music groups
Musical groups established in 2002
Musical groups from Hokkaido